The 1837 Anglesey by-election was a parliamentary by-election held for the House of Commons constituency of Anglesey in North Wales on 23 February 1837.

Vacancy
The by-election was called following the resignation of the sitting member Richard Williams-Bulkeley.

Candidates
The Whigs nominated solicitor William Owen Stanley who was the son of John Stanley, 1st Baron Stanley of Alderley and the younger twin brother of Edward Stanley, 2nd Baron Stanley of Alderley.

The Conservatives nominated Owen John Augustus Fuller Meyrick.

Result

References

See also
 1907 Anglesey by-election
 1923 Anglesey by-election
 List of United Kingdom by-elections

1837 elections in the United Kingdom
1837 in Wales
History of Anglesey
February 1837 events
By-elections to the Parliament of the United Kingdom in Welsh constituencies
1830s elections in Wales